Sector research institutes of Denmark are state-owned independent research institutes under various Danish Government ministries, whose primary task is to do research in various fields. All institutes classified as sector research institute are subject to the law of Sector research institutes, law #326 of May 5, 2004, previously law #1076 of December 20, 1995.

The Ministry of Science, Technology and Innovation (Danish: Ministeriet for Videnskab, Teknologi og Udvikling) decides which institutes are classified as sector research institutes. The Ministry also consults with Det Strategiske Forskningsråd before abolishing or establishing new institutes.

List of Sector research institutes

Ministry of Employment

 National Research Centre for the Working Environment (NRCWE)

Forsvarsministeriet
 Forsvarets Forskningstjeneste (FOFT)

Ministry of Health and Prevention
 Statens Serum Institut (SSI)
 Statens Institut for Folkesundhed (SIF)

Miljøministeriet
 Danmarks Miljøundersøgelser (DMU)
 Danmarks og Grønlands Geologiske Undersøgelse (GEUS)
 Forskningscentret for Skov og Landskab (FSL)
 Kort- og Matrikelstyrelsen (KMS)

Ministeriet for Fødevarer, Landbrug og Fiskeri
 Danmarks Fiskeriundersøgelser (DFU)
 Danmarks JordbrugsForskning (DJF)
 Danmarks Veterinærinstitut (DVI)
 Fødevareøkonomisk Institut (FØI)
 Institut for Fødevaresikkerhed og Ernæring (IFE)
 Statens Skadedyrlaboratorium (SSL)

Ministeriet for Videnskab, Teknologi og Udvikling
 Analyseinstitut for Forskning (AFSK)
 Center for Sprogteknologi (CST)
 Dansk Rumforskningsinstitut (DRI)
 Forskningscenter Risø
 Institut for Grænseregionsforskning (IGF)

Socialministeriet
 John F. Kennedy Instituttet (JFK)
 The Danish National Centre for Social Research (SFI)

Økonomi- og Erhvervsministeriet
 Statens Byggeforskningsinstitut (By & Byg)

Trafikministeriet
 Danmarks TransportForskning (DTF)
 Danmarks Meteorologiske Institut (DMI)

Udenrigsministeriet
 Dansk Bilharziose Laboratorium (DBL)

Government of Denmark
Research institutes in Denmark
Scientific organizations based in Denmark